Tu Tithe Mee is a Marathi movie released on 22 April 1998. The film is produced by Smita Talwalkar and directed by Sanjay Surkar. It received the Best Feature Film in Marathi award at the 46th National Film Awards.

Cast 
 Mohan Joshi as Nanasaheb Date
 Suhas Joshi as Usha
 Smita Talwalkar as Kanchan
 Prashant Damle as Shyam
 Kavita Lad as Kavita
 Sudhir Joshi 
 Sunil Barve
 Sharvani Pillai
 Sharmila Medhekar- Kulkarni
 Sharad Talwalkar
 Shrikant Moghe
 Chitra
 Shriram Ranade

Soundtrack
The music has been provided by Anand Modak.

"Shodhit Gaav Aalo Swapnat Pahilele" - Ravinda Sathe
"Aalo Kuthun Kothe Tudveet Paaywat" - Jayashri Shivram
"Ujale Waat" - Ravinda Sathe
"Jal Dahulale Bimb Harapale" - Ravinda Sathe
"Shabdavina Othatale Kalale Mala" - Roopkumar Rathod
"Saad Kokil Ghalato" - Jayashri Shivram
"Yugayuganche Naate Apule" - Roopkumar Rathod
"Ganyachya Bhendya Ie Antakshari" - Anuradha Marathe, Jaydip Dhamdhere Sripad Bhave, Suvarna Mategaonkar

Awards and accolades
Winner of 2 National Awards 46th National Film Awards Best Feature Film in Marathi category
Winner of 12 State Awards
Winner of 5 Filmfare Awards

References

External links 

1998 films
Best Marathi Feature Film National Film Award winners
1990s Marathi-language films
Films scored by Anand Modak